The Glasser effect describes the creation of singularities in the flow field of a magnetically confined plasma when small resonant perturbations modify the gradient of the pressure field.

External links 
 Physics of magnetically confined plasmas 

Fusion power